Stevan Petrović, KCMT, known as Stevan Knićanin (Стеван Книћанин, Stevan of Knić; 15 February 1807 – 14 May 1855) was a Serbian voivode (commander) of the Serbian volunteer squads in Serbian Vojvodina during the 1848 revolution.

Life

Stevan Petrović was born on 15 February 1807 in Knić near Kragujevac (hence his nickname), during the Serbian Revolution, the region at the time being part of the Sanjak of Smederevo of the Ottoman Empire (today Serbia). During the rule of Prince Miloš Obrenović, Knićanin's political career began as a commissioner of the Jasenica municipality in 1835, and in 1839 as a commissioner of the Smederevo district, but he eventually joined the opposition as a Constitutionalist and supporter of the rival Prince Aleksandar Karađorđević of the Karađorđević dynasty. Since he supported "ustavobranitelji" (the defenders of the constitution), he was expelled from the Principality of Serbia in 1840–1841. He returned in 1842, after Aleksandar Karađorđević had acceded to the throne on 14 September, after being elected the Prince of Serbia at the National Assembly in Vračar.

1848 revolution

During the 1848 Revolution, the Hungarians demanded national rights and autonomy within the Austrian Empire. However, they did not recognize the national rights of other nationalities which lived in the Habsburg Kingdom of Hungary in that time.

As part of the Revolutions of 1848, the Serbs under Austria-Hungary demanded what they had in the previous century; recognition of Serbian as official language, equality of the Orthodox church as with Catholics, and annual church assembly gatherings. They met at Sremski Karlovci and Novi Sad. Several thousand Serbs met at the May Assembly in Sremski Karlovci on 1 May 1848. The delegates chose prominent Austrian-Serb general Stevan Šupljikac as voivode, the civil and military commander (Duke). Josif Rajačić was elected the patriarch of the Serbs. The Serbs demanded a national unit consisting of Banat, Bačka, Baranja and part of Srem, known collectively as Vojvodina. This was completely against the Hungarian authorities visions.

From May 1848 onward, Serbs of Vojvodina directly sought aid from the Serbian Principality, and on 10 May, general Stratimirović, head of the main committee, appealed to Prince Aleksandar for assistance and urged Knićanin to intercede. Knicanin was elected military commander. He had no prior experience in war, nor went to military school.

In June and July a large wave of volunteers from the Principality entered Vojvodina. Knićanin arrived on 25 July. Among others who arrived were: the brother and nephew of Hajduk Veljko, council member Milutin Petrović, major Stanojlo Petrović, captain Sava Petrović and voivode prota Nenadović.

From August 1848, Knićanin was a commander of the Serbian volunteer squads in the Serbian Vojvodina, in which unit also Golub Babić fought in. The size of his army exceeded 8,000 or 10,000 men. His military knowledge was expressed in more occasions, especially in the battles near Pančevo and Vršac during the 1848 Revolution in what was then the Austrian Empire.

After his return to Serbia in May 1849, Knićanin was awarded with the title of voivode by Aleksandar Karađorđević, at that time it had only been given to Toma Vučić Perišić. He was a "Knight of Maria Therese", the highest order of the Austrian army.

Later years and death
As a result of a stroke in 1854, he died on 14 May 1855, in Belgrade.

Legacy

In 1850, Louis Kossuth wrote: "Bold Knicanin did wonders of bravery on the Lower Danube,"

The village of Knićanin in the Serbian province of Vojvodina was named after him.

References

Literature
 Jovan Mirosavljević, Brevijar ulica Novog Sada 1745–2001, Novi Sad, 2002.
Barbara Jelavich, History of the Balkans: Eighteenth and nineteenth centuries
Vojna enciklopedija, Beograd, 1970., knjiga prva, strana 423.

Radoš Ljušić, 2008, Ilija Garašanin on Serbia's Statehood

External links

Nasa Borba, Junak poput mramornog stuba  (Serbian)

1807 births
1855 deaths
19th-century Serbian people
Serbian revolutionaries
Serbian military leaders
Knicanin, Stevan Petrovic
People of Serbian Vojvodina
People of the Revolutions of 1848
People from Knić
Interior ministers of Serbia